Crinotarsus is a genus of longhorn beetles of the subfamily Lamiinae.

 Crinotarsus plagiatus Blanchard, 1853
 Crinotarsus sulcatus Breuning, 1947

References

Desmiphorini